Levitation is the fourth studio album by Bahraini-English band Flamingods. It was released on May 3, 2019 through Moshi Moshi Records.

Critical reception
Levitation was met with generally favorable reviews from critics. At Metacritic, which assigns a weighted average rating out of 100 to reviews from mainstream publications, this release received an average score of 69, based on 5 reviews.

Track listing

Charts

References

2019 albums
Moshi Moshi Records albums